45 Aquilae, abbreviated 45 Aql, is a triple star system in the equatorial constellation of Aquila. 45 Aquilae is its Flamsteed designation. The system is moving closer to the Earth with a heliocentric radial velocity of -46 km/s.

Based upon a stellar classification of A3 IV, the primary component of this system is a subgiant star that is in the process of evolving away from the main sequence. The star has 2.6 times the mass of the Sun and is spinning with a projected rotational velocity of 75 km/s. It has an orbiting companion with a period of 20.31 years and an eccentricity of 0.054. At an angular separation of 42.2 arcseconds from this pair is a 12.7 magnitude tertiary companion.

References

External links
 HR 7480
 CCDM 19407-0037
 Image 45 Aquilae

A-type subgiants
Triple star systems
Aquila (constellation)
Durchmusterung objects
Aquilae, 45
185762
096807
7480